Ovesey is a surname and may refer to:

Lionel Ovesey (1915–1995), American psychoanalyst
Regina Ovesey (1921–2003), American advertising executive